William Dollard (baptised 29 November 1789 – 29 August 1851) was an Irish born Canadian Roman Catholic priest and Bishop of Saint John in America, New Brunswick from 1842 to 1851. William was born in Co. Kilkenny, Ireland, to Michael Dollard and Anastasia Dunphy. He studied in St Kieran's College, Kilkenny, and completed his theological training in Canada.

References

External links
 Catholic-Hierarchy entry

1789 births
1851 deaths
19th-century Roman Catholic bishops in Canada
Irish emigrants to pre-Confederation New Brunswick
People from County Kilkenny
Roman Catholic bishops of Saint John, New Brunswick